The 1982 United States Senate election in Pennsylvania was held on November 2, 1982. Incumbent Republican U.S. Senator John Heinz successfully sought re-election to another term, defeating Democratic nominee Cyril Wecht.

General election

Candidates
H. John Heinz III, incumbent U.S. Senator (Republican)
Barbara I. Karkutt (Libertarian)
Liane Norman (Consumer)
William H. Thomas (Socialist Workers)
Cyril Wecht, member of the Allegheny County Board of Commissioners (Democratic)

Campaign
John Heinz's Democratic opponent in the 1982 election was Allegheny County commissioner and former coroner Cyril Wecht, who lacked significant name recognition outside of Pittsburgh, his home town. Although the 1982 elections were a setback nationally for incumbent President Ronald Reagan and the Republican Party, neither Heinz nor incumbent Republican governor Dick Thornburgh, who was also up for re-election in 1982, were challenged by Democrats with statewide prominence. Wecht ran a low-budget campaign lacking the assets to boost his name recognition; The Philadelphia Inquirer ran a headline dubbing the race "The Race for Senator No One Seemed to Notice." Despite this, Heinz ran a cautious campaign, running as a moderate due to Pennsylvania's unemployment, 11%, one of the highest in the nation at the time, as well as the declining health of Pennsylvania's coal mining, manufacturing and steel industries. In the end, Heinz won the election by a wide margin, winning 59.3% of the popular vote. Wecht won 39.2% of the popular vote.

Results

See also 
 1982 United States Senate elections

References 

Pennsylvania
1982
1982 Pennsylvania elections